Magburaka Technical Institute is a two-year technical college located in Magburaka, Tonkolili District, Sierra Leone. It was established in 1975. The school awards diplomas and certificates in areas such as Engineering, Electrician, Carpentry, Plumbing, Business Management and Agricultural science. It is one of the largest technical institutes in Sierra Leone.

Current programmes
Certificate in Engineering
Certificate in Carpentry
Certificate in Plumbing
Certificate in Electrician
Certificate in Agricultural study
Certificate in Business management

External links
https://web.archive.org/web/20080208073457/http://www.oldfranciscans.org/newsandevents/keynoteaddresses.html

Universities and colleges in Sierra Leone
1975 establishments in Sierra Leone
Educational institutions established in 1975